Liana-Gabriela Ungur (née Balaci; born 2 January 1985) is a former professional tennis player from Romania. On 13 December 2010, she reached her highest singles ranking of 157 by the Women's Tennis Association (WTA).

Personal life
Liana, daughter of Romanian football legend Ilie Balaci, is married to Adrian Ungur who is also a professional tennis player.

ITF Circuit finals

Singles: 26 (13–13)

Doubles: 18 (6–12)

References

External links

 
 
 

1985 births
Living people
Romanian female tennis players